This is a list of all the reasons written by Michel Bastarache during his tenure as puisne justice of the Supreme Court of Canada.

1998

1999

2000

2001

2002

2003

2004

2005

2006

2007
 Kingstreet Investments Ltd v New Brunswick (Finance), [2007] 1 S.C.R. 3, 2007 SCC 1 (majority)
 Little Sisters Book and Art Emporium v Canada (Commissioner of Customs and Revenue), [2007] 1 S.C.R. 38, 2007 SCC 2 (majority)
 R v Trochym, [2007] 1 S.C.R. 239, 2007 SCC 6 (dissent)
 Canada (AG) v Hislop, [2007] 1 S.C.R. 429, 2007 SCC 10 (concurrence)
 R v Bryan, [2007] 1 S.C.R. 527, 2007 SCC 12 (majority)
 Lévis (City of) v Fraternité des policiers de Lévis Inc, [2007] 1 S.C.R. 591, 2007 SCC 14 (majority)
 Canadian Western Bank v Alberta, [2007] 2 S.C.R. 3, 2007 SCC 22 (concurrence)			
 British Columbia (AG) v Lafarge Canada Inc, 2007 SCC 23 (concurrence)
 R v Hape, 2007 SCC 26 (concurrence)
 Dell Computer Corp v Union des consommateurs, 2007 SCC 34 (dissent)
 Named Person v Vancouver Sun, [2007] 3 S.C.R 252, 2007 SCC 43 (majority)
 R v Daley, [2007] 3 S.C.R. 523, 2007 SCC 53 (majority)

2008
 Dunsmuir v New Brunswick, [2008] 1 S.C.R. 190, 2008 SCC 9 (majority)
 R v Stirling, [2008] 1 S.C.R. 272, 2008 SCC 10 (majority)
 Société de l'assurance automobile du Québec v Cyr, 2008 SCC 13 (majority)
 Société des Acadiens et Acadiennes du Nouveau‑Brunswick Inc v Canada, 2008 SCC 15 (majority)
 Evans v Teamsters Local Union No 31, 2008 SCC 20 (majority)
 R v McLarty, 2008 SCC 26 (dissent)
 Stein v Stein, 2008 SCC 35 (majority)
 R v Kapp, 2008 SCC 41 (concurrence)
 Honda Canada Inc v Keays, 2008 SCC 39 (majority)

Bastache